Solid Rock Radio is a non-commercial Christian rock  music internet radio station based in Aiken, South Carolina, United States.

History 
Solid Rock Radio first hit the web in July 2006. The station is listener supported and depends on contributions for operating funding; it does not sell paid advertising.

Programming 
Programming includes music by such artists as: Skillet, RED, Decyfer Down, Set For The Fall, Disciple, We Are Vessel, Zahna, Random Hero, As We Ascend and more.

References

External links 

Christian websites
Internet radio stations in the United States